Jón Guðni Fjóluson (born 10 April 1989) is an Icelandic professional footballer who plays as a centre-back for Hammarby IF in Allsvenskan.

Career

Fram
Jón started playing football at the Ægir Þorlákshöfn youth academy. In 2007, aged 18, he joined Fram in the Úrvalsdeild, Iceland's first tier. In 2010, he had trials with both Bayern Munich and PSV Eindhoven.

Beerschot
On 6 June 2011, Jón moved to Beerschot in the Belgian Pro League. Following the 2011–12 season, after being given limited playing time, he was allowed to leave on a free transfer.

GIF Sundsvall
On 24 August 2012, Jón signed a three and half year-contract with GIF Sundsvall in Allsvenskan, competing with Marcus Danielson and Stefan Ålander for one of the two centre-back positions. The club was relegated from Sweden's first tier the same year, through a play-off loss against Halmstads BK. In 2013, Sundsvall finished third in Superettan, as Jón only made ten league appearances due to injuries, but lost once again to Halmstads BK in the promotion play-offs.

In 2014, Jón established himself as a key player for GIF Sundsvall, being named Player of the Year by the Medelpad Football Association, as the club won a promotion through finishing second in the Superettan table. In 2015, Jón made 29 league appearances in Allsvenskan, scoring once, as the club finished 12th in the table.

IFK Norrköping
On 1 December 2015, Jón moved to IFK Norrköping on a free transfer, signing a three year-deal. He became the club's first new signing after winning the 2015 Allsvenskan. In 2016, Jón began the season as a starter, making 16 appearances as the club finished 3rd in the table, before getting injured in September and being ruled out for the rest of the season.

In 2017, IFK Norrköping reached the final of Svenska Cupen, the main domestic cup, but lost 1–4 against Östersunds FK. During the summer transfer window, Fjoluson reportedly attracted interest from Turkish club Konyaspor, but IFK Norrköping declined an offer of 5 million Swedish kronor. IFK Norrköping finished 6th in the Allsvenskan table and Jón ended the season by playing all 30 league games.

In January 2018, Belgian club Zulte Waregem put in a new offer worth 5 million Swedish kronor for Jón, but it was once again declined by IFK Norrköping. He continued as a starter, making 13 Allsvenskan appearances before leaving in the summer transfer window with six months left on his contract.

Krasnodar
On 10 August 2018, Jón transferred to FC Krasnodar in the Russian Premier League, signing a three year-deal. He saw his playing time limited at Krasnodar, and on 22 July 2020, manager Murad Musayev announced that he would leave the club by mutual consent.

Brann
On 22 September 2020, Jón joined SK Brann in the Eliteserien, on a deal until the end of the year. He made 11 league appearances for the side and helped the club out of the relegation battle; SK Brann eventually finished 10th in the table.

Hammarby IF
On 16 January 2021, Jón signed a three-year contract with Hammarby IF, thus returning to the Swedish Allsvenskan. On 30 May 2021, he won the 2020–21 Svenska Cupen, the main domestic cup, with the club through a 5–4 win on penalties (0–0 after full-time) against BK Häcken in the final. He featured in all six games as the side reached the play-off round of the 2021–22 UEFA Europa Conference League, after eliminating Maribor (4–1 on aggregate) and FK Čukarički (6–4 on aggregate), where the club was knocked out by Basel (4–4 on aggregate) after a penalty shoot-out, although Jón scored a brace in the second leg at home. On 3 October, in a 1–3 away loss against his former club IFK Norrköping, Jón suffered a cruciate ligament injury, expected to keep him sideline until the summer of 2022. On 22 July 2022, it was announced that Jón would not return to the field until 2023, due to a setback in his rehabilitation.

International career
Jón played at the China Cup 2017, where Iceland won silver medals

Career statistics

Club

International goals
Scores and results list Iceland's goal tally first.

Honours

Club
Hammarby IF
 Svenska Cupen: 2020–21

References

External links
 Jón Guðni Fjóluson on Melar Sport homepage
 Official homepage of Jón Gudni Fjoluson on Facebook
 
 

1989 births
Living people
Jon Gudni Fjoluson
Association football defenders
Jon Gudni Fjoluson
Jon Gudni Fjoluson
Jon Gudni Fjoluson
Jon Gudni Fjoluson
Beerschot A.C. players
Belgian Pro League players
Expatriate footballers in Belgium
Jon Gudni Fjoluson
Expatriate footballers in Sweden
Jon Gudni Fjoluson
GIF Sundsvall players
IFK Norrköping players
FC Krasnodar players
SK Brann players
Hammarby Fotboll players
Jon Gudni Fjoluson
Allsvenskan players
Superettan players
Russian Premier League players
Eliteserien players
Expatriate footballers in Russia